Alan de Jesús Puga Olivares (born 8 April 1995 in San Francisco del Rincón, Guanajuato) is a Mexican professional footballer who plays in the midfielder position for Club León Premier.

References

Living people
1995 births
Mexican footballers
Association football midfielders
Club León footballers
Liga MX players
Liga Premier de México players
Tercera División de México players
Footballers from Guanajuato
People from San Francisco del Rincón